This is a list of notable diners. A diner is a prefabricated restaurant building characteristic of American life. They are commonly found in New England, the Midwest, New York City, Pennsylvania, New Jersey, and in other areas of the Northeastern United States, but they are not limited to these areas; examples can be found throughout the United States, Canada and parts of Western Europe. Diners are characterized by offering a wide range of foods, mostly American, a casual atmosphere, a counter, and late operating hours. Diners commonly stay open 24 hours a day, especially in cities, making them an essential part of urban culture, alongside bars and nightclubs.

Diners

Diners on the U.S. National Register of Historic Places

International American-style diners
 OK Diner – a roadside restaurant chain in the United Kingdom
 Eddie Rocket's – an Irish restaurant chain
 Karen's Diner – Australian chain of theme restaurants

Historical
 Doggie Diner

Fictional diners
 Mel's Diner
 Olympia Cafe

See also

 Bar mleczny
 Cha chaan teng – the term for diners in Hong Kong
 Dhaba – the term for Indian diners
 Diners, Drive-Ins and Dives
 Diner lingo
 Greasy spoon
 Lunch counter
 Mamak stall
 Roadside attraction
 Sandwich bar
 London cabmen's shelter
 Types of restaurant

Diner building manufacturers
 Fodero Dining Car Company
 Jerry O'Mahony Diner Company
 Kullman Dining Car Company
 Mountain View Diners Company
 Silk City Diners
 Worcester Lunch Car Company

References

External links
 

 
Diners